David Domingo Sabatini is an Argentine-American cell biologist and the Frederick L. Ehrman Professor Emeritus of Cell Biology in the Department of Cell Biology at New York University School of Medicine, which he chaired from 1972 to 2011. Sabatini's major research interests have been on the mechanisms responsible for the structural complexity of the eukaryotic cell. Throughout his career, Sabatini has been recognized for his efforts in promoting science in Latin America.

Early life and education
Sabatini is a native of Argentina, and attended medical school in Rosario at the National University of the Litoral. He began his research career at the University of Buenos Aires, in the laboratory of Eduardo De Robertis, a founder of modern cell biology, where he developed skills in electron microscopy. In 1961, as a Rockefeller Foundation fellow, he traveled to the United States, first for a six-month stint at Yale University to work with histochemist Russell Barnett, and then to work with George Palade and Philip Siekevitz at the Rockefeller University. Whilst at Yale he introduced glutaraldehyde as a fixative for electron microscopy and cytochemistry. After a year as a postdoctoral fellow at Rockefeller, Sabatini entered the Rockefeller graduate program from which he received a PhD in 1966 for studies on protein translation by ribosomes attached to endoplasmic reticulum membranes.

Research overview
Sabatini's research has focused on the mechanisms by which proteins are targeted to different organelles within the cell. His early work studied co-translational targeting of ribosomes to the endoplasmic reticulum and helped establish the hypothesis that signal peptides direct protein traffic to cellular compartments. He later focused on trafficking from the Golgi apparatus to secretory vesicles and to the plasma membrane and in particular the mechanisms that address membrane proteins to the different surface domains of epithelial cells for which he employed viral infected epithelial monolayers.

Academic career
After finishing his PhD, Sabatini joined the faculty at Rockefeller and in his own laboratory continued studies on protein trafficking in the ER. With a group of young associates (Nica Borgese, Mark Adelman, and Gert Kreibich), collaborating with Gunter Blobel, he continued research on the mechanism  that ensures the co-translational translocation and vectorial discharge of nascent polypeptides into and across the endoplasmic reticulum membrane. In in vitro experiments they discovered that the microsomal membrane protected the N-terminal portion of nascent polypeptides synthesized in membrane bound ribosomes from proteolytic attack by exogenous enzymes. These studies strongly implicated the N-terminal portions of nascent polypeptides in establishing and maintaining the association of bound ribosomes with ER membranes.

Largely based on these findings, in 1971 Blobel and Sabatini proposed a speculative model that later came to be known as the "signal hypothesis". For a discussion of the genesis and evolution of the signal hypothesis see LaBonte, 2017 In the 1971 paper, Blobel and Sabatini proposed that “all mRNAs to be translated on bound ribosomes have a common feature, such as several codons near their 5’ end, not present in mRNAs which are to be translated on free ribosomes” and that “the resulting common sequence of amino acids near the N-termini of the nascent chains, or a modification of it, would then be recognized by a factor mediating the binding to the membrane." They proposed that "This binding factor could be a soluble protein, which recognizes both a site on the large ribosomal subunit and a site on the membrane.” A decade later, Walter and Blobel demonstrated the existence of a Signal Recognition Protein (SRP) that mediates the binding of the ribosome and the signal sequence within the nascent chain to the membrane.  In 1982, a cognate receptor for the Signal Recognition Particle (SRP) was discovered and characterized in the ER membrane.

In 1972, Sabatini moved his laboratory to the New York University School of Medicine to become the chair of the Department of Cell Biology, where he assembled a group that focused on the study of membrane and organelle biogenesis. Initially, that work placed a primary emphasis on identifying structural features of secretory, lysosomal  and integral membrane proteins  that are synthesized on membrane bound ribosomes, address them to specific subcellular locations and determine their disposition within a membrane.

In the late 1970s, in collaboration with Marcelino Cereijido he introduced the now widely used MDCK cell culture system for the study of epithelial cell polarity and together with Enrique Rodriguez-Boulan reported the landmark discovery of the asymmetric budding of specific enveloped viruses from the different surfaces of epithelial cells.

Honors and awards
Sabatini was elected a fellow of the American Academy of Arts and Sciences in 1980 and became a member of the U.S. National Academy of Sciences in 1985.  In 1986, together with Günter Blobel, he received the E.B. Wilson Medal, the highest honor of the American Society of Cell Biology, of which he was president in 1978-79. He was selected to give the ASCB's Keith R. Porter Lecture in 1983.

He is a member of the U.S. National Academy of Medicine, a member of the American Philosophical Society, and a foreign associate of the French Academy of Sciences. He was awarded the Charles Leopold Mayer Prize (1986) and the Grand Médaille d’Or (2003) by the French Academy of Sciences, and in 2006 he was named a Chevalier de la Légion d’honneur.

Personal life
Sabatini's wife Zulema is also from Argentina and is a medical doctor specializing in pathology. The couple's two sons are both current or former MD–PhD academic research scientists and Howard Hughes Medical Institute investigators: Bernardo L. Sabatini is a neuroscientist at Harvard Medical School and David M. Sabatini was a cell biologist at the Massachusetts Institute of Technology until he resigned in 2022.

References

Cell biologists
Rockefeller University alumni
New York University faculty
Fellows of the American Academy of Arts and Sciences
Members of the United States National Academy of Sciences
Living people
Year of birth missing (living people)
Fellows of the American Academy of Microbiology
Members of the American Philosophical Society
American biochemists
Argentine biochemists
Members of the National Academy of Medicine